Daniele Bracciali and Matteo Donati were the defending champions but chose not to defend their title.

Tomislav Brkić and Ante Pavić won the title after defeating Rogério Dutra Silva and Szymon Walków 6–4, 6–3 in the final.

Seeds

Draw

References

External links
 Main draw

Internazionali di Tennis Città di Perugia - Doubles
2019 Doubles